Dobroselica may refer to the following villages in Serbia:
 Dobroselica (Rekovac)
 Dobroselica (Čajetina)